Patrick Gallagher (born 9 April 1989) is a professional boxer who challenged once for the British, and Commonwealth welterweight titles in 2019. As an amateur he won gold at the 2010 Commonwealth Games.

Amateur awards
2009 Irish Amateur Boxing Association Best U21
Irish under 21 light welterweight champion
Irish Intermediate champ
Ulster Elite runner up

Amateur career

2010 Commonwealth Games
Gallagher represented Northern Ireland in the Delhi Commonwealth Games in the welterweight division. He won the gold medal, defeating England's Callum Smith 11–6 in the final. 
6 October 2010 Qualification Bout 56 – defeated Joseph Mulema  3–0
8 Oct 2010 1/8 Eliminations Bout 107 – defeated Suruz Bangali 9–0
10 Oct 2010 Quarterfinals Bout 168 – defeated Mujandjae Kasuto  7–5
11 Oct 2010 Semifinals Bout 197 – defeated Dilbag Singh  5–4
13 Oct 2010 Finals Gold Medal Bout 213 – defeated Callum Smith  11–6

2011–2012 World Series of Boxing
Gallagher boxed for the Mumbai Fighters during the 2011 WSB season.  He finished up with a record of 1–1.

Week 1 – defeated by Sergiy Derevyanchenko  TKO
Week 4 – defeated Russell Lamour  (48:47, 48:47, 47:48)

Professional career

Professional contract
On 22 May 2012 Gallagher signed his professional contract with John Rooney, deciding to keep his base in Belfast.

Professional boxing record

{|class="wikitable" style="text-align:center; font-size:95%"
|-
!
!Result
!Record
!Opponent
!Type
!Round, time
!Date
!Location
!Notes
|-
|7
|Loss
|5–2
|align=left| Johnny Coyle
|UD
|3
|5 Apr 2014
|align=left|
|align=left|
|-
|6
|Win
|5–1
|align=left| Mark Douglas
|TKO
|1 (3)
|5 Apr 2014
|align=left|
|align=left|
|-
|5
|Loss
|4–1
|align=left| Erick Ochieng
|UD
|3
|5 Apr 2014
|align=left|
|align=left|
|-
|4
|Win
|4–0
|align=left| Aleksas Vaseris
|TKO
|1 (4)
|18 Nov 2013
|align=left|
|
|-
|3
|Win
|3–0
|align=left| Jozsef Garai
|TKO
|1 (4)
|14 Sep 2013
|align=left|
|
|-
|2
|Win
|2–0
|align=left| Andrew Patterson
|TKO
|1 (4)
|26 Nov 2012
|align=left|
|
|-
|1
|Win
|1–0
|align=left| William Warburton
|UD
|4
|22 Sep 2012
|align=left|
|

References

External links
 
 Results.cwgdelhi2010.org
 
 Rte.ie

1989 births
Living people
Male boxers from Northern Ireland
Welterweight boxers
Boxers at the 2010 Commonwealth Games
Commonwealth Games gold medallists for Northern Ireland
Commonwealth Games medallists in boxing
Medallists at the 2010 Commonwealth Games